Grażyna Syrek (born 9 January 1972) is a Polish long-distance runner. She competed in the women's marathon at the 2004 Summer Olympics.

References

External links
 

1972 births
Living people
Athletes (track and field) at the 2004 Summer Olympics
Polish female long-distance runners
Polish female marathon runners
Olympic athletes of Poland
Place of birth missing (living people)